Michael Bustin is a Senior Investigator at the National Cancer Institute, National Institutes of Health (NIH). His research centers on the role of chromosomal proteins in chromatin function, epigenetic regulation, development, and disease.

Biography, education and research career 
Bustin was born (April 19, 1937) in Romania. After the Second World War, he emigrated to Israel where he grew up in a communal settlement and served in the IDF. He received his BSc from University of Denver and his Ph.D. from the University of California, Berkeley. He did postdoctoral work in protein chemistry in the laboratory of Nobel laureates Stanford Moore and William Howard Stein at the Rockefeller University in New York, and in immunochemistry at the Weizmann Institute of Science, Israel, where he produced antibodies to histones, and pioneered their use for studies on chromatin structure and function.  

He joined NIH in 1975 where he serves as a Senior investigator and focuses on studying the biological function and mechanism of action of nucleosome binding proteins, with specific emphasis on Histone H1 and HMGN proteins. 

He has been an adjunct professor at Georgetown University (1984-1990), and a visiting professor at Tel Aviv University, Israel. He has published over 275 scientific articles.

Awards and honors
Bustin has received the following awards and honors:
 Jacob and Lena Joels Foundation Visiting Professorship Award from the Hebrew University (2007) 
 Humboldt Research Award from the Alexander von Humboldt Foundation, Germany (1997)
 1993 Tosse-Preis fur Kinderrheumatologie from the German Rheumatology Society (1993)
 NIH Award from NCI (1989)
 Janett and Samuel Lubell Prize from the Weizmann Institute (1975)

References 

1937 births
Living people
University of Denver alumni
University of California, Berkeley alumni
Rockefeller University faculty
Academic staff of Weizmann Institute of Science
Georgetown University faculty
National Institutes of Health faculty
Molecular biologists
Humboldt Research Award recipients